Djugun is a northern suburb of Broome, Western Australia within the local government area of the Shire of Broome. The name relates to the language of the local Djugun or Jukun Aboriginal people. Its population has increased from 2,067 at the 2006 Census to 2,833 at the 2016 census.

Facilities
Broome International Airport is located within the suburb, which also contains Roebuck Primary School and the Broome Recreation and Aquatic Centre.

References

External links
 Broome International Airport
 Roebuck Primary School
 Broome Recreation and Aquatic Centre

Suburbs of Broome, Western Australia